Sebastian Elmaloglou is an Australian actor best known for portraying the role of Max Sutherland on the long-running Australian soap opera Home and Away from 2002 to 2004.

Background

Sebastian trained at the Keane Kids Studios where he studied acting, singing, and dancing.  He has worked on numerous stage productions with Sydney Theater Company and Sydney Opera.  He made two appearances on G.P. and one on Fallen Angels prior to joining Home and Away.  He has also worked on television ads.  His brothers, Peter and Dominic Elmaloglou, and his sister Rebekah Elmaloglou have also appeared on Home and Away.  Dominic played Sebastian Harrison in 1996, and Rebekah is well known for portraying the role of Sophie Simpson from 1990 to 1993. He is the cousin of English actors Jeffrey and Dame Judi Dench.

Career

Filmography 

 G.P. (2 episodes, 1995–96) (TV)
 Fallen Angels (1 episode, 1997) (TV)
 Home and Away (main role, 2002–04) (TV)
 Home and Away: Secrets and the City (2002) (V)
 Home and Away: Hearts Divided (2003) (V)
 The Saturday Show (1 episode, 2004) (TV)

Theater 
 Gypsie boy 2001
 Bunt piano 1999
 Merrily rolling along 1996

References

External links

Year of birth missing (living people)
Living people
Australian male television actors
Australian people of English descent
Australian people of Greek descent
Dench family